The 2020–21 Northwestern Wildcats men's basketball team represented Northwestern University in the 2020–21 NCAA Division I men's basketball season. They were led by eighth-year head coach Chris Collins, the Wildcats played their home games at Welsh-Ryan Arena in Evanston, Illinois as members of the Big Ten Conference.

Previous season
The Wildcats finished the 2019–20 season 8–22, 3–17 to finish in 13th place in Big Ten play. They lost in the first round of the Big Ten tournament to Minnesota.

Offseason

Departures

Recruiting class

Roster

Schedule and results

|-
!colspan=9 style=|Regular season

|-
!colspan=9 style=|Big Ten tournament

Rankings

*AP does not release post-NCAA Tournament rankings^Coaches did not release a Week 1 poll.

References

Northwestern Wildcats
Northwestern Wildcats men's basketball seasons
Northwestern Wild